Tania Fierro (born 2 February 1972) is a Mexican sailor. She competed in the women's 470 event at the 1988 Summer Olympics.

References

External links
 

1972 births
Living people
Mexican female sailors (sport)
Olympic sailors of Mexico
Sailors at the 1988 Summer Olympics – 470
Place of birth missing (living people)